Georgia's 6th Senate District elects one member of the Georgia Senate. Its current representative for the session 2019–20 is Democrat Jennifer Jordan

District officeholders

Notes

References

External links
 Senate District 6 at Georgia Senate

Georgia Senate districts